This is a list of notable people from Uttar Pradesh, a state in India. The criteria of this list includes those who were born in the state of Uttar Pradesh and that part of the former United Provinces that now is part of the modern state of Uttar Pradesh.

Deities and avatars
 Rishabhanatha or Aadinath(birthplace: Ayodhya ) 1st teerthankar of Jainism and founder of Jainism 
 Aranath (birthplace: Hastinapur, Uttar Pradesh), 18th Teerthankar of Jainism
 Lord Shree Krishna (birthplace: Mathura) deity worshiped across many traditions of Hinduism
 Kunthunath (birthplace: Hastinapur, Uttar Pradesh), 17th Teerthankar of Jainism
 Lakshmana (birthplace: Ayodhya), brother and close companion of Rama; a hero in the epic Ramayana
 Neminath (birthplace: Mathura), 22nd Teerthanks of Jainism
 Parashuram (birthplace: Ghazipur), was an avatar of Vishnu
 Parsvanatha (birthplace: Varanasi, Uttar Pradesh), was 23rd Tirthankara of Jainism
 Rama (birthplace: Ayodhya), legendary or historical king of ancient India; in Hinduism, he is considered to be the seventh avatar of Vishnu
 Shantinath (birthplace: Hastinapur, Uttar Pradesh), 16th Teerthankar of Jainism
 Shreyansnath (birthplace: Varanasi, Uttar Pradesh), 11th Teerthankar of Jainism

Authors of the great epics
 Bhrigu (birthplace: Ballia), one of the seven great sages, the Saptarshis, one of the Prajapatis created by Brahma
 Sur (birthplace: Mathura), saint, poet and musician
 Tulsidas (Ramayana: Chitrakoot), Awadhi poet and philosopher; wrote Rāmacaritamānasa ("The Lake of the Deeds of Rama"), an epic devoted to Lord Rama
 Vyasa, central and much revered figure in the majority of Hindu traditions; authored Mahabharata

Yogis, Sufi poets and mystics

 Amir Khusro, Sufi mystic, one of the iconic figures in the cultural history of the Indian subcontinent
 Bharat Bhushan, only Padmashri recipient in yoga; founder President of Mokshayatan International Yogashram, Saharanpur
 Ghazi Saiyyad Salar Masud, Gazi Miya of Bahraich
 Kabir, poet and saint Varanasi
 Nizamuddin Auliya, Sufi saint, born in Budaun
 Paramahansa Yogananda, Yogi and Guru who introduced Yoga in the West. Born in Gorakhpur in 1893.
 Salim Chishti, Sufi saint of Fatehpur Sikri, Agra
 Dushyant Kumar

Poet-saints and religious figures

 Narottama Dasa
 Devraha Baba, Yogi Allahabad
 Jagadguru Rāmabhadrācārya, Vaishnava scholar and Sanskrit commentator on the Prasthanatrayi, Jaunpur.
 Mulla Mahmud Jaunpuri (1606–1651), natural philosopher
 Karamat Ali Jaunpuri (1800-1873), Islamic scholar
 Hafiz Ahmad Jaunpuri (1834-1899), Islamic scholar
 Abdul Awwal Jaunpuri (1867–1921), Islamic scholar
 Abdur Rab Jaunpuri (1875–1935), Islamic scholar
 Majid Ali Jaunpuri (died 1935), Islamic scholar
 Syed Rashid Ahmed Jaunpuri (1889–2001), Sufi saint
 Muhammad Yunus Jaunpuri (1937–2017), Islamic scholar
 Malik Mohammad Jayasi
 Ramanand, founder of the Rāmānandī sect Prayag (in modern Allahabad)
 Raskhan
 Sant Ravidas, poet and saint, Varanasi
 Shiv Dayal Singh, founder and first guru of Radha Soami sect, Agra
 Shrivatsa Goswami, Indologist and Gaudiya Vaishnava leader
 Sur, blind Hindu poet, saint and musician born in Runkata near Agra
 Swami Karpatri, teacher of Advaita, popularly known as Dharma Samrat, Gorakhpur
 Swaminarayan, founder of the Swaminarayan sect, Gonda
 Tulsidas, composer of the Ramcharitmanas

Rulers and generals

Ancient
Keśin Dālbhya, king of Panchal
Pravahana Jaivali
Pasenadi, King of Kosala
Virudhaka
Chandragupta I Maurya, Emperor of India
Samudragupta Maurya, Emperor of India
Chandragupta II Maurya, Emperor of India
Kumaragupta I Maurya 
Skandagupta Maurya

Medieval
Rajyavardhana
Harsha

Modern

Mughals
Jahangir

Nawab of Awadh
 Asaf-Ud-Dowlah, fourth Nawab, founder of modern Lucknow
 Wajid Ali Shah, poet, choreographer, the last King of Awadh

Banaras state
Balwant Singh
Prabhu Narayan Singh
Vibhuti Narayan Singh

Kohra Estate
Babu Himmat Sah
Babu Bhoop Singh

Independence fighters

Indian Rebellion of 1857 

 Mangal Pandey, one of the earliest independence fighters of 1857
 Chandra Shekhar Azad Chandra Shekhar Tiwari, India's one of the top most Freedom Fighter
 Bakht Khan, nominal commander-in-chief of Indian rebel forces in the Indian Rebellion of 1857
Amar Shahid Bandhu Singh, fighter in Indian Rebellion of 1857, he was from Dumari Riyasat of Gorakhpur
 Begum Hazrat Mahal, widow of the last Nawab of Awadh; Indian independence fighter in Indian Rebellion of 1857
 Lal Pratap Singh, fighter in Indian Rebellion of 1857 and Yuvraj of Kalakankar
 Maulvi Liaquat Ali, Indian independence fighter of 1857 from Allahabad; captured the Khusro Bagh in Allahabad and declared the independence of India
 Rani Lakshmibai, Rani (Queen) of Jhansi
 Rao Kadam Singh, freedom fighter; elected by his Gurjar clansmen as their leader to fight against the British forces during the Indian Rebellion of 1857
 Jhalkari Bai Koli, Great Indian freedom fighter of 1857; fought against British rule; Commander of Army of Jhansi
 Dhan Singh Gurjar, main freedom fighter of 1857 revolt from Meerut
 Babu Bhoop Singh, fighter in Indian Rebellion of 1857 and Ruler of Kohra

Later 19th and 20th centuries
 Acharya Narendra Dev, socialist
 Asaf Ali, independence fighter
 Ashfaqullah Khan of Kakori, Indian independence fighter; member of Hindustan Socialist Republican Association; close associate of Bhagat Singh and Chandrashekhar Azad
 Chandra Shekhar Azad, Indian independence fighter, member of Hindustan Socialist Republican Association
 Chittu Pandey, independence fighter
 Ganesh Shankar Vidyarthi, independence fighter, journalist
 Govind Ballabh Pant, Indian independence fighter and politician; Chief Minister of the United Provinces; Bharat Ratna recipient
 Hasrat Mohani, independence fighter and poet
 Laxmi Raman Acharya, freedom fighter accused of the Agra Conspiracy case
 Mahavir Tyagi, independence fighter
 Maulana Mohammad Ali, independence fighter
 Maulana Shaukat Ali, independence fighter
 Mukhtar Ahmed Ansari, independence fighter, Ghazipur
 Munishwar Dutt Upadhyay of Pratapgarh, Indian Independence fighter; two time Member of Parliament
 Purushottam Das Tandon, independence fighter
Roshan Singh, (kaakori conspiracy) independence fighter
 Rafi Ahmed Kidwai, Indian independence fighter and socialist
 Raja Mahendra Pratap, King of Hathras Princely State, known as Aryan Peshwa
 Rajendra Lahiri, independence fighter
 Ram Manohar Lohia, socialist
 Ram Prasad Bismil Indian independence fighter and socialist (Kakori conspiracy)
 Swami Sahajanand Saraswati, freedom fighter.
 Dhan Singh Gurjar, first freedom fighter of 10 May 1857 Mutiny
 Vijay Singh Pathik
 Rao Umrao Singh Bhati of Dadri

Award winners

Param Vir Chakra

 Company Quartermaster Havildar Abdul Hamid, Ghazipur
 Captain Manoj Kumar Pandey
 Naik Jadu Nath Singh Rathore Shahjahan pur, fighter of World War II and Indo-Pakistani War of 1947–1948
 Subedar Major Yogendra Singh Yadav, of Aurangabad, Bulandshaher; hero of Tiger Hill in Kargil war

Maha Vir Chakra
 Brigadier Mohammad Usman Azamgarh
 Captain Mahendra Nath Mulla
 Lance Naik Ram Ugrah Pandey
 Air Chief Marshall Swaroop Krishna Kaul

Ashok Chakra

 Constable Kamlesh Kumari
 Naik Neeraj Kumar Singh
 Lieutenant Colonel Harsh Uday Singh Gaur
 Lieutenant Colonel Jas Ram Singh

Bharat Ratna
 Bhagwan Das, philosopher and freedom fighter, Varanasi
 Jawaharlal Nehru, leader of the Indian independence movement; first Prime Minister of India
 Lal Bahadur Shastri, freedom fighter, former Prime Minister; belonged to Varanasi and Allahabad
 Rajrishi Purushottam Das Tandon, freedom fighter, Allahabad
 Ravi Shankar, sitar maestro, Ghazipur
 Pandit Madan Mohan Malviya, educationist and politician, founder of Banaras Hindu University, Varanasi
 Atal Bihari Vajpayee, politician, eleventh Prime Minister of India

Padma Vibhushan
 Ustad Ghulam Mustafa Khan
 Amitabh Bachchan
 Kishan Maharaj
 Uday Shankar

Padma Bhushan
 Ustad Ghulam Mustafa Khan
 Amitabh Bachchan, film actor
 Mahesh Prasad Mehray, ophthalmologist
 Bhagwati Charan Varma, Hindi author
 Irfan Habib, historian
 Josh Malihabadi, poet
 Kishan Maharaj, tabla maestro
 Obaid Siddiqui, science
 Qurratulain Hyder, author
 Rahul Sankrityayan
 Ram Kinkar Upadhyay, scholar
 Srilal Shukla, Hindi writer
 Naushad, music director

Padma Shree

 Bekal Utsahi poet, writer
 Giriraj Kishore writer
 Gopaldas Neeraj, Hindi poet and lyricist
 Hakim Syed Zillur Rahman, scholar of Unani medicine
 Hamid Ansari, Vice President of India
 K. P. Saxena, writer
 Kanhai Chitrakar
 Kapil Deva Dvivedi
 Kunwar Digvijay Singh Babu, hockey Olympian
 Mohammed Shahid, ex-captain of Indian hockey team, Varanasi
 Muzaffar Ali, film director
 Prakash Singh
 Praveen Chandra, cardiac surgeon
 Vidya Niwas Mishra, writer
 Yogiraj Bharat Bhushan, only Padmashri awardee yogi; founder director of Mokshayatan International Yogashram at Saharanpur
 Ravindra Jain, singer, music composer, lyricst
 Malini Awasthi

Dada Saheb Phalke Award
 Majrooh Sultanpuri, lyricist
 Naushad Ali, music composer
 Amitabh Bachchan, film actor, film producer, television host, occasional playback singer

Gyananpith Awards

 Akhlaq Mohammed Khan
 Ali Sardar Jafri, writer and poet
 Amarkant
 Firaq Gorakhpuri, poet
 Mahadevi Verma, poet
 Qurratulain Hyder, writer
 Sri Lal Sukla

Magasaysay Award
 Rajendra Singh, water conservationist
 Sandeep Pandey

Arjuna Award
 Abhinn Shyam Gupta, badminton
 Ashish Kumar, gymnastics
 Jagbir Singh, hockey
 Moraad Ali Khan, shooter
 Syed Modi, badminton
 Varun Bhati,

Major DhyanChand Award
 Rajkumar Baisla, (Wrestling) from Vill. Mewla Bhatti, Ghaziabad

Science and medicine

 Anil K. Rajvanshi, sustainability and rural development expert
 Afroz Ahmad, environmental scientist and administrator
 Harish-Chandra (Mehrotra), mathematician who did fundamental work in representation theory, especially harmonic analysis on semisimple Lie groups
 Atul Kumar, CSIR-CDRI (inventor of anti-osteoporosis drug)
 Lalji Singh, molecular biologist
 P. K . Sethi, inventor of the Jaipur foot
 Prem Chand Pandey, scientist, physicist, meteorologist, oceanographer
 Kazi Mobin-Uddin, inventor of Inferior vena cava filter
 Shahid Jameel, Indian virologist
 Hassan Nasiem Siddiquie, Indian marine geologist and former director of the National Institute of Oceanography.
 Mriganka Sur, Indian-born neuroscientist working in the United States
 Digvijai Singh
 Sri Niwas, Indian geophysicist.
 Salimuzzaman Siddiqui, organic chemist specialising in natural product chemistry
 Rajendra K. Pachauri, chairman of the Intergovernmental Panel on Climate Change
 Ravindra Khattree, statistician who worked in statistical inference, multivariate analysis, experimental designs, biostatistics and quality control
 Syed Ziaur Rahman, medical pharmacologist
 Rajeev Kumar Varshney, agricultural scientist, genomics specialist, biotechnologist
 Zahoor Qasim, oceanographer, leader of first Indian expedition to Antarctica

Holders of high offices

President
 Ram Nath Kovind, 14th President of India

Vice president
 Gopal Swarup Pathak, former Vice-President of India
 Hamid Ansari, former Vice-President of India

Prime ministers

 Jawaharlal Nehru, first Prime Minister of India and Bharat Ratna awardee
 Lal Bahadur Shastri, second Prime Minister of India and Bharat Ratna awardee
 Indira Gandhi, fourth Prime Minister of India and Bharat Ratna awardee
 Choudhary Charan Singh, fifth Prime Minister of India
 Rajiv Gandhi, sixth prime minister of India and Bharat Ratna awardee
 Vishwanath Pratap Singh, eighth Prime Minister of India
 Chandra Shekhar, ninth Prime Minister of India
 Atal Bihari Vajpayee. eleventh Prime Minister of India and Bharat Ratna awardee

Governors
 A R Kidwai, Governor of Haryana
 Girish Chandra Saxena, former Governor of Jammu & Kashmir
 K.M. Seth, former Governor of Chhattisgarh
 Kalyan Singh, Governor of Rajasthan
 Khurshid Alam Khan, former Governor of Karnataka
 Mohammad Fazal, former Governor of Maharashtra
 Mohammad Yunus Saleem, former Governor of Bihar
 Ram Naresh Yadav, Governor of Madhya Pradesh
 Syed Sibtey Razi, Governor of Jharkhand
 Triloki Nath Chaturvedi, former CAG and former Governor of Karnataka
 Virendra Verma, former Governor of Punjab and Himachal Pradesh
 Kalraj Mishra, Governor of Rajasthan and former Governor Himanchal Pradesh
 Satya Pal Malik, Governor of Meghalaya and former governor of Odisha, Bihar, Jammu and Kashmir,Goa

Chief Justices
 Kailas Nath Wanchoo, former Chief Justice of India
 Kamal Narain Singh, former Chief Justice of India
 Mirza Hameedullah Beg, former Chief Justice of India
 Mohammad Hidayatullah, former Chief Justice of India
 Raghunandan Swarup Pathak, former Chief Justice of India
 V. N. Khare, former Chief Justice of India

Chief Ministers

 Muhammad Ahmad Said Khan Chhatari
 Govind Ballabh Pant
 Sampurnanand
 Sucheta Kripalani
 Chandra Bhanu Gupta
 Choudhary Charan Singh
 Tribhuvan Narain Singh
 Kamalapati Tripathi
 Hemvati Nandan Bahuguna
 Narayan Dutt Tiwari
 Ram Naresh Yadav
 Banarsi Das
 Vishwanath Pratap Singh
 Sripati Mishra
 Vir Bahadur Singh
 Mulayam Singh Yadav
 Kalyan Singh
 Ram Prakash Gupta
 Rajnath Singh
 Mayawati
 Akhilesh Yadav
 Yogi Adityanath

Political figures

Pre Independence

 Govind Ballabh Pant
 Jawaharlal Nehru
 Motilal Nehru, Indian National Congress leader
 Mukhtar Ahmed Ansari, former President of Indian National Congress
 Munishwar Dutt Upadhyay
 Pandit Madan Mohan Malaviya
 Rai Rajeshwar Bali, education minister (1924–1928)
 Sampurnanand
 Swami Sahajanand Saraswati

Post Independence
 Ajai Rai, 5 time MLA from Varanasi
 Akhilesh Das, union minister
 Akhilesh Yadav
 Amar Mani
 Arif Mohammad Khan, political leader
 Bacha Pathak, 7 time MLA from Bansdih constituency, 2 time cabinet minister in Uttar Pradesh government
 Beni Prasad Verma, former minister and leader
 Chandra Shekhar, former prime minister of India
 Chaudhary Ajit Singh, political leader
 Choudhary Charan Singh
 Deen Dayal Upadhyaya
 Devendra Nath Dwivedi, Indian politician and Governor designate of Gujarat
 Dinanath Bhaskar, political leader; former minister
 Feroze Gandhi
 Govind Ballabh Pant
 Hemvati Nandan Bahuguna
 Indira Gandhi
 Kalyan Singh, UP CM and Rajasthan Governor; BJP Vice President
 K.C. Tyagi
 Kailash Nath Katju, former Union Home Minister and lawyer
 Kalpnath Rai
 Kamal Nath, politician
 Kamlesh Paswan, politician
 Kamlesh Tiwari, founder of Hindu Samaj Party, who insulted Muhammad, was imprisoned, and murdered after his release
 Kamalapati Tripathi
 Laxmi Raman Acharya
 Mahendra Singh Tikait, Kisan leader
 Manohar Lal (b. 1938), UP MLA, cabinet minister
 Mohsina Kidwai
 Mulayam Singh Yadav
 Mayawati
 Narayan Dutt Tiwari
 Om Prakash Singh
 Prakash Vir Shastri, member of Parliament and advocate of the Arya Samaj movement
 Rafi Ahmed Kidwai
 Raj Babbar, member of Parliament
 Raj Narain
 Raja Bhaiya
 Rajeev Shukla, journalist and political leader
 Rajendra Kumari Bajpai (1925–1999), former cabinet minister
 Rajkumari Amrit Kaur, Gandhian, first lady Minister of India
 Ram Govind Chaudhary

 Ram Chandra Vikal, Deputy Chief Minister
 Ram Manohar Lohia
 Ram Naresh Yadav
 Sanjay Singh, King of Amethi
 Satyapal Singh Yadav, former union minister
 Satyaveer Munna
 Sheila Kaul
 Shriprakash Jaiswal, union minister
 Shiv Pratap Shukla, Member of Parliament (Rajya Sabha), Minister of state (finance), former Cabinet Minister (Government of Uttar Pradesh)
 Shyama Charan Gupta, politician, entrepreneur
 Shyamlal Yadav, former union minister and Deputy Chairman of Rajya Sabha
 Sunder Lal
 Suresh Pasi, ministries of housing, vocational education, skill development

 Thakur Ji Pathak, activist, Indian political leader
 Vishwanath Pratap Singh, 7th prime minister of India

Authors

Hindi

 Acharya Chatursen (1891–1960), Hindi writer
 Acharya Kuber Nath Rai
 Amitabh Thakur Hindi writer
 Amritlal Nagar, Hindi writer
 Ayodhya Prasad Upadhyay, Hindi writer
 Babu Gulabrai, Hindi writer
 Baldev Upadhyaya, Hindi scholar and writer
 Bhagwati Charan Verma, Hindi writer
 Bharatendu Harishchandra, Hindi writer
 Hazari Prasad Dwivedi, Hindi novelist
 Jaishankar Prasad, Hindi writer
 Kashi Nath Singh, Hindi writer
 Mahapandit Rahul Sankrityayan, polyglot
 Malik Muhammad Jayasi, author of Padmavat
 Munshi Prem Chand, novelist
 Rahi Masoom Raza, author of Topi Shukla and Adha Gaon
 Rajendra Yadav, Hindi novelist
 Ramchandra Shukla, Hindi writer and historian
 Parichay Das, essayist, poet, critic
 Ravindra Prabhat, Hindi novelist
 Sachchidananda Hirananda Vatsyayan
 Shrilal Shukla, writer of Raag Darbari
 Sri Krishna Rai Hridyesh
 Swami Sahajanand Saraswati, author of books on sociology, religion, freedom struggle, peasant movement, and autobiography
 Vibhuti Narain Rai, Hindi writer
 Vidya Niwas Mishra, Hindi scholar
 Vinod Kumar Shukla, writer
 Vishnu Sarma, author of Panchtantra
 Viveki Rai
 Yashpal, Hindi writer

Urdu
 Firaq Gorakhpuri
 Hakim Syed Zillur Rahman, author of books on Unani medicine
 Ibne Safi, novelist of Jasoosi Duniya
 Ismat Chugtai, writer
 Mirza Hadi Ruswa, author of Umrao Jaan
 Qurratulain Hyder, writer of Aag Ka Darya

English

 Leema Dhar, novelist, poet and columnist
 Attia Hosain, English author and journalist
 Ajay K. Pandey, English author
 Anil Swarup, English author
 Nayantara Sahgal, novelist and writer
 Allan Sealy, novelist and writer
 Vikas Swarup, author of Q&A

Poets

Urdu
 Akbar Allahabadi, poet
 Ali Sardar Jafri, Urdu poet
 Bekal Utsahi, Urdu poet
 Brij Narayan Chakbast, Urdu poet
 Daya Shankar Kaul Nasim, Urdu poet
 Firaq Gorakhpuri, Urdu poet, winner of Jnanpith award
 Hasrat Mohani, Urdu poet
 Jigar Moradabadi, Urdu poet
 Josh Malihabadi, Urdu poet
 Kaifi Azmi, Urdu and Hindi lyricist, poet and songwriter
 Khumar Barabankvi, Urdu poet
 Majaz, Urdu poet
 Majrooh Sultanpuri, poet and lyricist
 Maulana Hali, Urdu poet, biographer of Ghalib's life, and a commentator of his poetry
 Mir Anis, Urdu Marsiya poet
 Mir Taqi Mir
 Mirza Ghalib, classical Urdu and Persian poet
 A. M. Turaz, Poet & Film writer
 Safi Lakhnavi, Urdu poet
 Zaigham, Urdu poet who migrated to Bengal

Hindi

 Acharya Kuber Nath Rai, Lit Nibandh
 Ayodhya Prasad Upadhyay
 Gopal Das Neeraj, Hindi poet
 Guru Bhakt Singh 'Bhakt'
 Harikrishna Prasad Gupta Agrahari, poet
 Harivansh Rai Bachchan, writer and poet
 Jaishankar Prasad, one of the four major pillars of the Chhayavaadi school of Hindi
 Kaka Hathrasi, humorous poet
 Virendra Kumar Baranwal, writer of Jinnah: ek punardrishti
 Kedarnath Singh
 Mahadevi Varma, a major poet of the Chhayavaadi generation, a period of romanticism in modern Hindi poetry; won the Jnanpith award in 1982
 Maithilisharan Gupt, modern Hindi poet
 Shivmangal Singh Suman
 Subhadra Kumari Chauhan
 Sumitranandan Pant, one of the four major pillars of the Chhayavaadi school of Hindi
 Suryakant Tripathi 'Nirala'
 Kumar Vishwas

Bhojpuri
 Parichay Das
 Viveki Rai

Founders of educational institutions
 Sir Syed Ahmad Khan, founder of Aligarh Muslim University
 Pandit Madan Mohan Malaviya, founder of Banaras Hindu University
 Jagdish Gandhi, founder of the City Montessori School

Defence services

Army

 Abdul Hamid, four Grenadiers, Indian Army, Param Vir Chakra recipient
 Brigadier Mohammad Usman, recipient of Maha Vir Chakra
 K.M. Seth
 Lt. General Zameerud-din Shah
 Manoj Kumar Pandey, 11 Gorkha Rifles of the Indian Army, Param Vir Chakra recipient
 Yogendra Singh Yadav, 18th Grenadiers of the Indian Army, Param Vir Chakra recipient
 Asaram Tyagi, Mahavir Chakra in Indo-Pak war of 1965

Air Force
 S.K. Kaul, Air Chief Marshal (Retd)
 Trevor Keelor IAF, Vir Chakra winner in Indo-Pak war of 1965
 Denzil Keelor IAF, Air Marshall (Retd), Vir Chakra winner; Kirti Chakra recipient
 Norman Anil Kumar Browne, Air Chief Marshal (Retd)
 S.P. Tyagi, Air Chief Marshal (Retd)
 Rakesh Kumar Singh Bhadauria, Air Chief Marshal, 26th Chief of the Air Staff (India)

Navy
 Captain Mahendra Nath Mulla

Civil service / diplomacy

Indian Foreign Service
 Asaf Ali, first Indian Ambassador to the United States
 Braj Kumar Nehru, Indian diplomat and Ambassador of India to the United States
 Girija Shankar Bajpai, first Secretary-General of Foreign Affairs
 Shilendra Kumar Singh, former Foreign Secretary of India; former Governor of Rajasthan and Arunachal Pradesh
 Vijaya Lakshmi Pandit, Indian diplomat and politician; sister of Jawaharlal Nehru

Civil services
 Afroz Ahmad, member of NCA, Government of India
 Baleshwar Rai
 Chandrika Prasad Srivastava, bureaucrat
 Dharma Vira, ICS, cabinet secretary and governor of West Bengal, Mysore
 Isha Basant Joshi, first woman to be appointed an IAS officer
 Vinod Rai, CAG
 Wajahat Habibullah, Chief Information Commissioner of India

Music and dance

Musicians

 Ashutosh Bhattacharya (1917–2004), tabla player
 Begum Akhtar, ghazal singer
 Bismillah Khan, shehnai player, awarded the Bharat Ratna (2001)
 Cliff Richard, English singer
 Gopal Shankar Misra, vichitra veena player
 Hari Prasad Chaurasia, bansuri player
 Kishan Maharaj, tabla player
 Lalmani Misra, Indian classical musician
 Naushad Ali, music director; awarded the Dadasaheb Phalke Award for his contributions to Indian cinema
 Ravi Shankar, sitar player, awarded the Bharat Ratna in 1999; recipient of three Grammy awards
 Vishnu Narayan Bhatkhande, musicologist
 Vikash Maharaj sarod player,awarded the Karmveer,Shiromai,Manishi Ratn.

Singers

 Abhijeet Bhattacharya, from Kanpur
 Ankit Tiwari, from Kanpur
 Ravindra Jain
 Anup Jalota, Ghazal and Bhajan singer
 Girija Devi, Indian singer and represents the Banaras Gharana of singers
 Harshit Saxena, singer
 Kailash Kher, from Meerut
 Malini Awasthi
 Kanika Kapoor, from Lucknow
 Purshottam Das Jalota (1925–2011), bhajan singer, Padma Shri (2004)
 Sharafat Hussain Khan, from Atrauli
 Shubha Mudgal, singer
 Siddheshwari Devi, Hindustani singer from Banares, known as Maa (mother)
 Talat Mahmood, ghazal singer

Rappers
 Hard Kaur, from Kanpur
 Baba Sehgal

Dancers
 Birju Maharaj, Kathak exponent
 Lachhu Maharaj, Kathak exponent
 Kapila Vatsyayan, scholar of Indian classical dance
 Sitara Devi
 Uday Shankar

Sports

Hockey
 Dhyan Chand, former international field hockey player, awarded the Padma Bhushan
 Zafar Iqbal, former international captain of the Indian hockey team and Chief coach of Indian hockey team
 K. D. Singh, former national hockey player and Olympian
 Mohammed Shahid, former international field hockey player; member of the Indian team that won a gold medal at the 1980 Olympic Games in Moscow; awarded Arjuna Award in 1980 and Padma Shri in 1986
 Jagbir Singh, captain and member of National Hockey team in 1988 and 1992 Olympics; awarded Arjuna Award in 1990

Baseball
 Rinku Singh, one of the first two Indians to sign a professional baseball contract in the United States
 Dinesh Patel, one of the first two Indians to sign a professional baseball contract in the United States

Cricket

 Arun Lal, former Test cricketer
 Ashish Zaidi, cricketer
 Obaid Kamal, cricketer
 Bhuvneshwar Kumar, international cricketer
 Chetan Chauhan, former Test cricketer
 Gyanendra Pandey, cricketer
 Hemlata Kala, member of Indian women's cricket team
 Manoj Prabhakar, cricketer
 Mohammed Kaif, international cricketer
 Mohammed Shami, international cricketer
 Narendra Hirwani
 Piyush Chawla
 Priyam Garg
 Praveen Kumar
 Parvinder Awana
 R. P. Singh, Rae Bareli (U.P.), international cricketer
 Swapnil Singh, Rae Bareli (U.P.)
 Rajinder Hans
 Raman Lamba
 Rohan Gavaskar
 Sudip Tyagi
 Suresh Raina, international cricketer
 Surinder Amarnath
 Umesh Yadav, Deoria (U.P.), Indian cricketer
 Kuldeep Yadav, cricketer
 Shivam Mavi, cricketer
 Shubham Mavi
 Yashasvi Jaiswal

Badminton

 Abhinn Shyam Gupta, former national badminton champion
 Syed Modi, former national badminton champion

Other sports
 Annu Raj Singh, shooter
 Moraad Ali Khan, shooter
 Ghaus Mohammad, tennis player, the first Indian to reach quarterfinal of The Championships, Wimbledon
 Jaspal Rana, shooter
 Jitu Rai, shooter
 Varun Singh Bhati, para athlete
 Pawan Gupta (wushu), sanda fighter
 Nitin Tomar, Kabaddi
 Arjun Bhati, golfer
 Rinku Singh, Wrestler
 Saurabh Chaudhary, shooter

Journalism

 Aniruddha Bahal, investigative journalist
 Arun Nehru, former minister and columnist
 Dharamvir Bharati, former editor of Dharamyug magazine
 Feroze Gandhi, managing editor of National Herald
 Manikonda Chalapathi Rau, Indian journalist and an authority on Nehruvian thought
 Narendra Mohan, Dainik Jagran
 Pankaj Mishra, journalist
 Parichay Das, writer, essayist, poet and editor of contemporary Bhojpuri poetry
 Raghuvir Sahay, editor of Dinmaan
 Ram Bahadur Rai, magazine editor
 Saeed Naqvi, journalist and TV producer
 Sahu Ramesh Chandra Jain, Times of India and Navbharat Times
 Surendra Pratap Singh, editor of Ravivar
 Vinod Mehta, editor

Satire, comedy, cartoons
 Akbar Allahabadi, poet and satirist
 K. P. Saxena
 Kaak (b. 1940, Harish Chandra Shukla), cartoonist
 Kaka Hathrasi, satirist
 Raju Srivastava, actor and stand up comedian
 Tuntun, comedian

Cinema and theatre

Actors and actresses

 Amir Khan, actor; parents from Hardoi
 Aarun Nagar, actor and director 
 Anushka Sharma, actress
 Disha Patani, actress
 Jimmy Shergill, actor
 Abhishek Bachchan, actor
 Urvashi Rautela, actor
 Ankit Tiwari, singer
 Mika Singh, singer
 Nawazuddin Siddiqui, actor

 Achint Kaur, Indian television actress 
 Aditi Sharma, Bollywood actress
 Aditya Srivastava, actor and voiceover artist
 Akshay Oberoi, actor
 Ali Fazal, actor
 Amit Sial, Bollywood
 Amitabh Bachchan, Bollywood actor awarded the Padma Bhushan in 2001
 Anushka Sharma
 Archana Puran Singh, actress
 Arun Govil
 Ashutosh Rana, Indian film actor
 Chandrachur Singh, actor
 Disha Patani, actress from Bareilly
 Lara Dutta
 Pooja Batra
 Jimmy Shergill
 Rajpal Yadav
 Javed Jaffrey
 Dalip Tahil
 Zohra Segal
 Vivek Mushran
 Raj Babbar
 Tom Alter
 Kumar Gaurav
 Raza Murad
 Chunky Pandey
 Mandakini
 Nivedita Bhattacharya
 Dipti Bhatnagar
 Kamal Rashid Khan
 Nandini Singh
 Jaddanbai, actor
 K.N. Singh, actor
 Kadar Khan, actor
 Marc Zuber, actor
 Meenakshi Dixit, actress from Rae Bareli
 Naseeruddin Shah, actor; born in Barabanki district of Lucknow division, U.P.
 Nawazuddin Siddiqui, actor
 Nimmi, film actress in the 1950s
 Ravi Kishan, Bhojpuri film actor
 Saurabh Shukla, Bollywood actor
 Shweta Tiwari, Indian television actress
 Siddharth Nigam, Indian teen actor
 Sonal Chauhan, Bollywood actress
 Surinder Pal, actor
 Sushant Singh, actor
 Tanveer Zaidi, actor, educationist
 Tuntun, comedy actress
 Vedita Pratap Singh, model and actress
 Vishwajeet Pradhan, Bollywood actor
 Vineet Kumar Singh, actor
 Zakir Hussain, Indian film actor
 Zoya Afroz, Bollywood actress
 Harsh Nagar, Bollywood actor

Directors/producers

 Aarun Nagar, director
 Abhinav Kashyap, director
 Abhishek Chaubey, director
 Anurag Kashyap, director
 Farhan Akhtar, director
 Gajendra Singh, editor, director and producer
 K. Asif, film director, film producer and screenwriter
 Kamal Amrohi, director
 Prakash Mehra, director
 Prasoon Pandey, director
 Shaad Ali, film director
 Tigmanshu Dhulia, director
 Vishal Bhardwaj, director
 Zoya Akhtar, director

Singers

 Ankit Tiwari, singer
 Abhijeet Bhattacharya, singer
 Ravindra Jain
 Anup Jalota
 Baba Sehgal
 Kavita Seth
 Begum Akhtar
 Hemanta Kumar Mukhopadhyay
 Kabban Mirza
 Malini Awasthi
 Kanika Kapoor
 Rajkumari Dubey
 Sunidhi Chauhan
 Talat Mahmood

Lyricists
 Ali Sardar Jafri
 Ravindra Jain
 Anjaan
 Indeevar
 Javed Akhtar
 Kaifi Azmi
 Khumar Barabankvi
 Majrooh Sultanpuri
 Sameer
 Shakeel Badayuni
 Manoj Muntashir
 Santosh Anand
 A. M. Turaz

Composers
 Anand Milind
 Naushad Ali
 Shantanu Moitra

Theatre
 Arvind Gaur
 Nadira Babbar
 Sushil Kumar Singh

Cinematographers
 Ravikant Nagaich

Story/script/dialogue writers
 Javed Siddiqi, film script writer
 K. P. Saxena, dialogue writer of Lagaan, Swades
 S. Ali Raza
 Wajahat Mirza

Navratnas
 Raja Todar Mal, Finance Minister and one of the Navratnas of Akbar
 Abdul Rahim Khan-I-Khana, Hindi poet and a Navratna of Akbar
 Birbal, jester and poet of Akbar's court

Television
 Pavitra Punia
 Aditya Srivastava
 Gajendra Singh, conceived the concept of the reality show in 1992 with Antakshari and Sa Re Ga Ma
 Rahi Masoom Raza, dialogue writer of TV serial Ramayan
 Raju Srivastav
 Surendra Pal, character actor, best known for playing Dronacharaya in Mahabharat.
 Harsh Nagar, actor in various films and TV serials

Environmentalists
 Billy Arjan Singh, conservationist
 Afroz Ahmad

Scholars
 Arun Tiwari, missile scientist, author, professor
 Acharya Narendra Dev
 Adya Prasad Pandey, notable economist of Banaras Hindu University and Currently Vice Chancellor of Manipur University
 Masud Husain Khan, eminent linguist; first Professor Emeritus in Social Sciences at Aligarh Muslim University; fifth Vice-Chancellor of Jamia Millia Islamia, a central university in New Delhi
 Mushirul Hasan, historian
 Renu Khator, Chancellor of the University of Houston System; President of the University of Houston; first Indian American to lead a major research university in the United States
Saket Kushwaha, educationist and agricultural economist of Banaras Hindu University, currently Vice Chancellor of Rajiv Gandhi University, former Vice Chancellor of Lalit Narayan Mithila University
 Shah Syed Hasnain Baqai, Islamic scholar, thinker, reformer; known for his inclusive and broadminded interpretation of Islam; born in Safipur

Fine arts
 Aman Singh Gulati, world's first almond artist
 Gogi Saroj Pal
 Ram Chandra Shukla, painter

Business
 Sumit Jain, entrepreneur, co-founder and CEO Opentalk.to | Co-Founder and ex-CEO Commonfloor.com
 Gajendra Singh, CMD Saaibaba Telefilms; founder of Ganga Gauri Mahavidyalaya, Ramnagar, Baijabari, Azamgarh
 K.P. Singh, president of DLF Universal Group
 Shyama Charan Gupta, founder of Shyam Group
 Subroto Roy, founder of Sahara India
 Vinod Gupta, former CEO and chairman of InfoUSA; founder of Vinod Gupta School of Management, Indian Institute of Technology Kharagpur
 Surendra Singh Nagar
 Vijay Shekhar Sharma, founder and CEO of Paytm Chairperson of Paras Milk Pvt. Ltd.

Crime
 Abu Salem
 Daku Man Singh
 Mukhtar Ansari, MLA
 Munna Bajrangi
 Nirbhay Gujjar
 Phoolan Devi, minister
 Shri Prakash Shukla

Photographers
 Lala Deen Dayal, Indian photographer
 Tarun Khiwal (born 1967), Indian fashion and commercial photographer

Militants
Abdul Subhan Qureshi

Others
 Abdul Karim, Munshi to Queen Victoria
 Begum Samru, historical figure
 Deep Tyagi, pioneer of family planning programme in India
 Jaichand of Kannauj, historical figure
 Tabassum Mansoor, Indian educationist in Libya
 Rahul Mishra (born 1979), fashion designer
 Sampat Pal Devi, women's rights activist
 Sheila Dikshit, former Chief Minister of Delhi
 Vinod Rai, former CAG and IAS

See also
 List of people by India state
 List of people from Purvanchal
 States and territories of India

Notes

Uttar Pradesh